The Lingshi East railway station  is a railway station of Datong–Xi'an Passenger Railway that is located in Lingshi County, Shanxi, China. It started operation on July 1, 2014, together with the Railway.

Railway stations in China opened in 2014
Railway stations in Shanxi